The T series, also known as the T1, is the fourth series of rapid transit rolling stock used in the subway system of Toronto, Ontario, Canada. They were ordered by the Toronto Transit Commission (TTC) in 1992 and built in one production set between 1995 and 2001 by Bombardier Transportation in Thunder Bay, Ontario, Canada.

Currently based entirely out of Greenwood Subway Yard, the T1s are the older of the two currently active series of rolling stock on the heavy-rail lines in the Toronto subway network. Following the introduction of the newer Toronto Rocket train sets, all T1 trains now operate exclusively in six-car configurations on Line 2 Bloor–Danforth. They previously operated on Line 1 Yonge–University and in a four-car configuration on Line 4 Sheppard until the retirement of the last remaining H-series trains in 2014 and until the implementation of one-person train operation on the latter in 2016.

Design advances
The T1 cars entered service between 1995 and 2001 and became the mainstay of the TTC subway fleet. By 1999, they had replaced the older M1s, H1s, H2s and prototype H3s, along with some H4s, many of which had been in revenue service since the 1960s.

The T1s had many of the same technical specifications of the H series, including the same married pair configuration, and incorporated many of the design elements that had been refined throughout the H-series program. Each model in the H-series production run improved on the last, adding features such as a single-handle controller for acceleration and braking, air conditioning, a change from camshaft to chopper control, and regenerative braking. The T1 built on those advances (such as changing from a rotary-type to a fore–aft, joystick-type controller) while integrating new computer technology (analogous to the New Technology Train of the New York City Subway), creating a more modern train. The T-series cars were the first TTC cars to use AC propulsion, rather than DC propulsion as used in all previous rolling stock, all of which are now retired.

Other improvements included wider entry and exit doorways, flip-up seats for the installation of wheelchair positions (which are now marked in blue velour to signify priority seating areas instead of the red velour used for other seats), and the removal of vertical stanchions along the car's centre line, making them the TTC's first subway cars to be wheelchair-accessible. The interior colour scheme consists of grey floors and walls and dark red doors and panels, unlike the simulated woodgrain panels used on the predecessor H-series cars.

Lines serviced
  Yonge–University line (1995–2015)
  Bloor–Danforth line (1995–present)
  Sheppard line (2002–2016)

Future
The T1s have a life expectancy that allows them to remain in service until at least 2026; however, at the end of 2019, the TTC proposed an overhaul to extend the T1 fleet's life by 10 years.

The TTC started implementing mid-life upgrades for the fleet including LED-type interior lighting, along with side LED destination signs and external pre-boarding route and destination announcements. As of 2019, the TTC is in the process of installing CCTV cameras on the remaining T1 subway fleet.

The TTC also considered upgrading the fleet to run on an automatic train control (ATC) system, which it is in the process of installing to replace the current wayside signaling system on Lines 1 and 4 and is expected to install on Line 2 by 2020 in conjunction with the opening of the Scarborough subway extension. However, due to prohibitively expensive costs of such a retrofit, it is unlikely that this will happen in the near future, and the TTC plans to replace all T1 trains with new ATC-compatible equipment instead.

Gallery

References

External links
 
 Page on the T-series cars at Transit Toronto

Toronto rapid transit passenger equipment
Bombardier Transportation multiple units
600 V DC multiple units
Electric multiple units of Canada